These tables list values of molar ionization energies, measured in kJ⋅mol−1. This is the energy per mole necessary to remove electrons from gaseous atoms or atomic ions.  The first molar ionization energy applies to the neutral atoms. The second, third, etc., molar ionization energy applies to the further removal of an electron from a singly, doubly, etc., charged ion.  For ionization energies measured in the unit eV, see Ionization energies of the elements (data page). All data from rutherfordium onwards is predicted.

All Ionization Energies

11th–20th ionisation energies

21st–30th ionisation energies

References 
 Ionization energies of the elements (data page)
  (for predictions)
 
  (for predictions)

Properties of chemical elements